Stumptown Wildlife Management Area is located in both Calhoun and Gilmer Counties near the community of Stumptown, West Virginia.

Access to Stumptown WMA is from the north off U.S. Route 33 on Mikes Run Road at Stumptown, on Middle Run Road at Lockney, and on Lower Run Road at Normantown.

Hunting, trapping and fishing

Hunting opportunities in Stumptown WMA include deer,  grouse, raccoon, squirrel, and turkey.

Fishing opportunities are very limited here, as both Middle Run and Lower Run tend to run dry most summers.

Camping is not allowed in the WMA. Camping is available at nearby Cedar Creek State Park.

See also

Animal conservation
Hunting
List of West Virginia wildlife management areas

References

External links
West Virginia DNR District 6 Wildlife Management Areas
West Virginia Hunting Regulations
West Virginia Fishing Regulations

Wildlife management areas of West Virginia
Protected areas of Calhoun County, West Virginia
Protected areas of Gilmer County, West Virginia
IUCN Category V